The Xinjiang Data Project is a China-focused Australian research project created and managed by the Australian Strategic Policy Institute (ASPI). The project states that it has identified grave human rights violations in Xinjiang, including the mass detention of minorities, and compulsory sterilizations. The researchers found that one out of every three mosques have been demolished in Xinjiang since 2017.

Launch and funding
The ASPI launched the Xinjiang Data Project in September 2020 as a part of its International Cyber Policy Centre. According to the project's website, initial funding for the project came from the United States Department of State.

Publication of information from Xinjiang

According to the project, satellite data has allowed it to locate "380 suspected detention facilities" in Xinjiang, and to estimate that 35 % of mosques in the region have been demolished, including a pilgrimage town, Ordam Mazar. The project says that it has also used interviews from former inmates to collect information. The project has promoted research by Adrian Zenz, a senior fellow at the Victims of Communism Memorial Foundation, who says that China has embarked on a program of mass sterilization in Xinjiang.

According to the researchers, development in the region is being used as a "facade for cultural erasure and desecration of religious sites."

The Chinese government has responded that the camps are vocational training and re-education programs meant to alleviate poverty and counter terrorism.

See also
 2020s in political history
 Human rights in China
 Australia–China relations
 Australia–United States relations
 China–United States relations
 Australia-Taiwan relations
 Xinjiang Victims Database

Citations

References cited

External links 
 

Australian defence policies
2020 establishments in Australia
Foreign policy and strategy think tanks in Australia
International relations
Australian foreign policy
Japanese foreign policy
United States foreign policy
Politics of Southeast Asia